Gumbs is a surname. Notable people with the name include:
Alexis Pauline Gumbs (born 1982), American writer and educator
Benjamin Gumbs II (died 1768), British colonial governor
Benjamin Gumbs III, British colonial governor and plantation owner
Sir Emile Gumbs (1928–2018), Anguillan politician
Frantz Gumbs (born 1954), French Saint Martinois politician
Godfrey Gumbs, professor of theoretical solid state physics
Jermaine Gumbs (born 1986), Anguillan international soccer player
Keith Gumbs (born 1972), St. Kitts and Nevis international soccer player
Marcel Gumbs (born 1953), 2nd Prime Minister of Sint Maarten
Onaje Allan Gumbs, (1949–2020), American pianist, composer and bandleader
Philip N. Gumbs (1923–2005), American politician
Romell Gumbs (born 1986), Anguillan international soccer player
Roy Gumbs (born 1969), Anguillan international soccer player
Roy Gumbs (boxer) (born  1954), Saint Kitts and Nevis boxer of the 1970s, '80s and '90s
Keir Gumbs (born 1974), renowned securities and governance lawyer; former counsel to SEC Commissioner